National Parks Act may refer to, among others, these acts:
 National Parks Act (Canada)
 National Parks Act 1980 (Malaysia)
 National Parks Act 1980 (New Zealand)
 National Parks and Access to the Countryside Act 1949 (United Kingdom)